Jiangnan Subdistrict is a Subdistrict in Changshou District, Chongqing, People's Republic of China.

Administrative division
The subdistrict is divided into 7 villages and 2 communities, the following areas: Nanbinlu Community, Longshan Community, Longqiaohu Village, Shantuo Village, Wubao Village, Dayuan Village, Juliang Village, Dabao Village, and Tianxing Village (南滨路社区、龙山社区、龙桥湖村、扇沱村、五堡村、大元村、锯梁村、大堡村、天星村).

External links

Divisions of Changshou District
Subdistricts of the People's Republic of China